Clearwater Paper Corporation is a pulp and paper product manufacturer that was created on December 9, 2008, via a spin-off from the real estate investment trust (REIT) company Potlatch Corporation. With its headquarters in Spokane, Washington, the new company started with four locations for the manufacture of bleached paperboard, consumer tissue, and wood products.

In late 2010, the company acquired Cellu Tissue Holdings, Inc., headquartered in Alpharetta, Georgia, which increased its tissue manufacturing presence in the eastern United States and Canada.  The total number of manufacturing sites rose to fourteen, with another in construction.

In November 2011, the company completed the sale of its Lewiston, Idaho, sawmill to Idaho Forest Group of Coeur d'Alene, Idaho.  Today, the company has two divisions: consumer products, and pulp and paperboard.

The company's newest facility at Shelby, North Carolina, officially started up in December 2012, producing its first private label through-air-dried (TAD) finished roll and converted tissue paper product to compete with national TAD tissue brands.  Clearwater Paper also completed upgrades to its North Las Vegas facility, allowing the facility to produce TAD ultra-bathroom tissue and household towels.

Clearwater Paper is the premier supplier of private label tissue products to the major retail grocery chains. It supplies more than half of the store brand bathroom tissue, paper towels, facial tissue and napkins to grocery stores in the United States.

Spin-off from Potlatch

The spin-off from Potlatch Corporation was announced by its board of directors July 17, 2008, with the official date for the creation of Clearwater Paper being December 9, 2008.

According to the IRS, the spin-off was ruled to be a tax-free distribution of stock as Potlatch issued 1 share of Clearwater Paper stock for every 3.5 shares of Potlatch stock, with fractional shares paid in cash. Clearwater Paper stock began trading on December 17.

Gordon L. Jones, who had been a vice president of Potlatch since July 2008, was chosen as the president and chief executive officer of Clearwater Paper.

At the end of the spin off, two stand-alone entities remained, both publicly traded: Potlatch Corporation (NYSE:PCH) and Clearwater Paper Corporation 
(NYSE:CLW).

Environmental Policies

Clearwater Paper also markets a number of  Forest Stewardship Council (FSC) products, including the brand Ancora, a high-end, coated, double-side bleached white paperboard. Of the three similar products manufactured in a full variety of sizes in the United States, it is the only one that has on-label FSC certification. Another of Clearwater Paper's brands is Candesce, which is sold for use in premium lines of C1S folding carton as well as paperboard for commercial printing, carded packaging and liquid packaging board. Candesce is the only brand of SBS (solid bleached sulfate) with FSC certification across its full range of calipers.

Clearwater Paper's paperboard mills in Cypress Bend, Arkansas, and Lewiston, Idaho, are also FSC and Sustainable Forestry Initiative (SFI) Chain of Custody certified.

Manufacturing Divisions

Clearwater Paper's facilities in the United States serve two separate divisions—consumer products and pulp and paperboard—within the company.

Consumer Products

The consumer products segment manufactures and sells household tissues, including paper towels, napkins, bathroom tissue and facial tissue. It produces over half of the store-brand, household tissues sold in grocery stores in the United States.

The consumer products division produces through-air-dried (TAD) paper towels, as well as premium and value brand towels. It makes napkins in ultra, two-ply and three-ply dinner napkins, plus value one-ply luncheon napkins. The bathroom tissue produced is mostly two-ply ultra, though other types are manufactured and sold. The facial tissues produced by the division include ultra lotion facial tissues. Clearwater Paper primarily produces ultra and premium qualities of the tissue it produces, though it does manufacture lower grades as well.

Pulp and paperboard

The company's pulp and paperboard segment manufactures bleached paperboard, primarily for the packaging industry.  Solid bleached sulfate board is a type of paperboard that is used in the production of folding cartons, liquid packaging, plates, cups and some commercial printing applications.

The pulp and paperboard segment also produces softwood market pulp, which is used as the primary raw material in the production of a wide variety of paper products, and slush pulp (excess or waste pulp), which it sends to the consumer products segment.

The pulp and paperboard division operates one facility in Idaho and one in Arkansas.

Facilities
Prior to the acquisition of Cellu Tissue in 2010, Clearwater Paper operated four facilities in the United States, which were previously owned by Potlatch until the spin-off.  Those facilities included Cypress Bend, Arkansas; Elwood, Illinois; Las Vegas, Nevada; and Lewiston, Idaho.

With the acquisition of Cellu Tissue Holdings, Inc., the company purchased 10 additional consumer products facilities at: East Hartford, Connecticut; Ladysmith, Wisconsin; Long Island, New York; Menominee, Michigan; Natural Dam, New York; Neenah, Wisconsin; Oklahoma City, Oklahoma; St. Catharines, Ontario, Canada; Thomaston, Georgia; and Wiggins, Mississippi.

The company's fifteenth facility is located at Shelby, North Carolina.

Clearwater Paper shut its Thomaston, Georgia, facility in December 2013 and its Long Island, New York, facility in February 2014, reducing the number of locations to 13.

Washington
Clearwater Paper's headquarters office is located at 601 West Riverside Avenue, Spokane, Washington, 99201.

References

External links

Companies listed on the New York Stock Exchange
Pulp and paper companies of the United States
Corporate spin-offs